Lyttelton may refer to:

Places
Lyttelton, New Zealand, a town in New Zealand
Lyttelton Harbour
Lyttelton road tunnel, New Zealand
Lyttelton (New Zealand electorate)
Lyttelton, Gauteng, a suburb of Centurion in Gauteng Province, South Africa

People
Lyttelton (surname)

Other
Baron Lyttelton, title in the British peerage
Leyton Cricket Ground (Lyttelton Ground), a cricket ground in Leyton, London
Lyttelton Engineering Works, now Denel Land Systems, a South African arms manufacturer
Lyttelton/Hart-Davis Letters, the published correspondence of George Lyttelton and Rupert Hart-Davis
Lyttelton Line, a train line between Lyttelton and Christchurch
Lyttelton Theatre, part of the British Royal National Theatre
Lyttelton Times, a New Zealand newspaper

See also
Littleton (disambiguation)